The Religious Freedom Restoration Act of 1993, Pub. L. No. 103-141, 107 Stat. 1488 (November 16, 1993), codified at  through  (also known as RFRA, pronounced "rifra"), is a 1993 United States federal law that "ensures that interests in religious freedom are protected." The bill was introduced by Congressman Chuck Schumer (D-NY) on March 11, 1993. A companion bill was introduced in the Senate by Ted Kennedy (D-MA) the same day. A unanimous U.S. House and a nearly unanimous U.S. Senate—three senators voted against passage—passed the bill, and President Bill Clinton signed it into law.

RFRA, as applied to the states, was held unconstitutional by the United States Supreme Court in the City of Boerne v. Flores decision in 1997, which ruled that the RFRA is not a proper exercise of Congress's enforcement power. However, it continues to be applied to the federal government—for instance, in Gonzales v. O Centro Espírita Beneficente União do Vegetal (2006) and Burwell v. Hobby Lobby Stores, Inc. (2014). These cases did not consider whether Congress was violating the Establishment Clause if it carves out exemptions based on religious laws from federal laws and regulations that it itself has authorized. In response to City of Boerne v. Flores and other related RFR issues, twenty-one individual states have passed State Religious Freedom Restoration Acts that apply to state governments and local municipalities.

Provisions
This law reinstated the Sherbert Test, which was set forth by Sherbert v. Verner, and Wisconsin v. Yoder, mandating that strict scrutiny be used when determining whether the Free Exercise Clause of the First Amendment to the United States Constitution, guaranteeing religious freedom, has been violated. In the Religious Freedom Restoration Act, Congress states in its findings that a religiously neutral law can burden a religion just as much as one that was intended to interfere with religion; therefore, the Act states that the "Government shall not substantially burden a person's exercise of religion even if the burden results from a rule of general applicability."

The law provided an exception if two conditions are met. First, the burden must be necessary for the "furtherance of a compelling government interest." Under strict scrutiny, a government interest is compelling when it is more than routine and does more than simply improve government efficiency. A compelling interest relates directly to core constitutional issues. The second condition is that the rule must be the least restrictive way in which to further the government interest.

Background and passage

The Free Exercise Clause of the First Amendment states that Congress shall not pass laws prohibiting the free exercise of religion. In the 1960s, the Supreme Court interpreted this as banning laws that burdened a person's exercise of religion (e.g. Sherbert v. Verner, 374 U.S. 398 (1963); Wisconsin v. Yoder, 406 U.S. 205 (1972)). But in the 1980s the Court began to allow legislation that incidentally prohibited religiously mandatory activities as long as the ban was "generally applicable" to all citizens.

But "generally applicable" bans frequently conflicted with Native American religious practice.  Often, government projects required acquisition of sacred grounds necessary for Native American rituals.  Ritual peyote use infringed on the federal war on drugs.  And the American Indian Religious Freedom Act, which Congress had passed to protect tribal religious freedoms, lacked an enforcement mechanism.

These interests collided in Lyng v. Northwest Indian Cemetery Protective Association, 485 U.S. 439 (1988), and Employment Division v. Smith, 494 U.S. 872 (1990).

In Lyng, members of the Yurok, Tolowa and Karok tribes argued that the First Amendment should prevent the U.S. Forest Service from constructing a road through sacred land used in ceremonies and prayer. The Supreme Court disagreed, arguing that only government coercion or punishment for religious beliefs would violate the First Amendment.

In Smith, the Court upheld the state of Oregon's refusal to grant unemployment benefits to two Native Americans fired from their jobs at a rehab clinic after testing positive for mescaline, the main psychoactive compound in the peyote cactus, which they had used in a religious ceremony.

The Smith decision outraged the public. Groups representing all points on the political spectrum (from the liberal American Civil Liberties Union to the conservative Traditional Values Coalition) and a wide variety of religions (i.e. the Christian Legal Society, the American Jewish Congress, the Baptist Joint Committee for Religious Liberty, and the National Association of Evangelicals) agreed that the law required reform, and recommended reinstating the Sherbert Test.  In response, Congress passed the RFRA, unanimously in the House and 97-to-3 in the Senate.  The bill was then signed by U.S. President Bill Clinton.

Applicability
The RFRA applies "to all Federal law, and the implementation of that law, whether statutory or otherwise", including any Federal statutory law adopted after the RFRA's date of signing "unless such law explicitly excludes such application."

According to a federal appeals court ruling on March 7, 2018, the RFRA does not justify discrimination against employees on the basis of their lesbian, gay, bisexual, or transgender identity. However, on October 15, 2019, federal judge Reed O’Connor said that, because of the RFRA, federally-funded healthcare insurers and providers must be allowed to deny medical treatment and coverage on the basis of the sex, gender identity or termination of pregnancy of the person who is requesting the services, even if the services are medically necessary. Transgender people may be turned down even if the healthcare service they need is not related to their being transgender.

Challenges and weaknesses

In 1997, part of this act was overturned by the United States Supreme Court. The Roman Catholic Archdiocese of San Antonio wanted to enlarge a church in Boerne, Texas, but a Boerne ordinance protected the building as a historic landmark and did not permit it to be torn down. The church sued, citing RFRA, and in the resulting case, City of Boerne v. Flores, the Supreme Court struck down the RFRA with respect to its applicability to States (but not Federally), stating that Congress had stepped beyond its power of enforcement provided in the Fourteenth Amendment. In response to the Boerne ruling, Congress passed the Religious Land Use and Institutionalized Persons Act (RLUIPA) in 2000, which grants special privileges to religious land owners.

A number of states have passed state RFRAs, applying the rule to the laws of their own state, but the Smith case remains the authority in these matters in many states.

The constitutionality of RFRA as applied to the federal government was confirmed on February 21, 2006, as the Supreme Court ruled against the government in Gonzales v. O Centro Espírita Beneficente União do Vegetal, which involved the use of an otherwise illegal substance in a religious ceremony, stating that the federal government must show a compelling state interest in restricting religious conduct.

Post-Smith, many members of the Native American Church still had issues using peyote in their ceremonies. This led to the Religious Freedom Act Amendments in 1994, which state, "the use, possession, or transportation of peyote by an Indian for bona fide traditional ceremony purposes in connection with the practice of a traditional Indian religion is lawful, and shall not be prohibited by the United States or any state. No Indian shall be penalized or discriminated against on the basis of such use, possession or transportation."

Tanzin v. Tanvir (2020) determined that RFRA allows for those whose religious rights are adversely affected by federal officers acting in their capacity for the government to seek appropriate remedies, including monetary damages, from those individuals. The case involved three Muslim men, all legal residents of the United States, who had been placed on the No Fly List by FBI agents for refusing to be informants for their fellow Muslim communities.

Applications and effects
The Religious Freedom Restoration Act holds the federal government responsible for accepting additional obligations to protect religious exercise. In O'Bryan v. Bureau of Prisons, it was found that the RFRA governs the actions of federal officers and agencies and that the RFRA can be applied to "internal operations of the federal government." RFRA, in conjunction with President Bill Clinton's executive order in 1996, provided more security for sacred sites for Native American religious rites.

As of 1996, the year before the RFRA was found unconstitutional as applied to states, 337 cases had cited RFRA in its three-year time range. It was also found that Jewish, Muslim, and Native American religions, which make up only three percent of religious membership in the U.S., make up 18 percent of the cases involving the free exercise of religion.
The Religious Freedom Restoration Act was a cornerstone for tribes challenging the National Forest Service's plans to permit upgrades to Arizona's Snowbowl ski resort. Six tribes were involved, including the Navajo, Hopi, Havasupai, and Hualapai. The tribes objected on religious grounds to the plans to use reclaimed water. They felt that this risked infecting the tribal members with "ghost sickness" as the water would be from mortuaries and hospitals. They also felt that the reclaimed water would contaminate the plant life used in ceremonies. In August 2008, the Ninth Circuit Court of Appeals rejected their RFRA claim.

In the case of Adams v. Commissioner, the United States Tax Court rejected the argument of Priscilla M. Lippincott Adams, who was a devout Quaker. She tried to argue that under the Religious Freedom Restoration Act of 1993, she was exempt from federal income taxes. The U.S. Tax Court rejected her argument and ruled that she was not exempt. The Court stated that "while petitioner's religious beliefs are substantially burdened by payment of taxes that fund military expenditures, the Supreme Court has established that uniform, mandatory participation in the Federal income tax system, irrespective of religious belief, is a compelling governmental interest." In the case of Miller v. Commissioner, the taxpayers objected to the use of social security numbers, arguing that such numbers related to the "mark of the beast" from the Bible. In its decision, the U.S. Court discussed the applicability of the Religious Freedom Restoration Act of 1993, but ruled against the taxpayers.

In Navajo Nation v. United States Forest Service, the Court of Appeals for the Ninth Circuit held that the use of recycled sewage water in order to manufacture artificial snow in the San Francisco Peaks was not a "substantial burden" on the religious freedom of Native Americans.

The RFRA figured prominently in oral arguments in the case, Burwell v. Hobby Lobby, heard by the Supreme Court on March 25, 2014. In a 5–4 decision, Justice Alito declared that nothing about the language of RFRA or the manner in which Congress passed it implied the statutory protections conferred therein were confined solely within the bounds of First Amendment case law as it existed pre-Smith.

20th anniversary
A day-long symposium was held at the Newseum in Washington, D.C., on Nov. 7, 2013, to commemorate the 20th anniversary of the Religious Freedom Restoration Act. "Restored or Endangered? The State of the Free Exercise of Religion in America" featured three panel discussions and two keynote addresses.

The first keynote address was from Oliver S. Thomas, the former general counsel of the Baptist Joint Committee for Religious Liberty and the chair of the diverse "Coalition for the Free Exercise of Religion" in the 1990s that worked for the passage of RFRA. The second was from Douglas Laycock, who was an author of RFRA. His address traced the legal history of RFRA and discussed its impact on current debates, including the contraception mandate and same-sex marriage laws.

The panel discussions covered the history and impact of RFRA, religious freedom and the contraceptive mandate of the Affordable Care Act, and current and future challenges to the free exercise of religion in a diverse society. The addresses and panel discussions are all available online, as well as a special downloadable resource with more on RFRA, published by the Baptist Joint Committee.

See also
 Freedom of religion in the United States
 Reuben Snake
 War on Drugs

References

External links
 Text of the statute
 Unconstitutional Restoration - A Princeton Law Journal article on the history, interpretation, and status of the Act.
 RFRAs and Public Policy
 RFRA history and resources from the Baptist Joint Committee
 Baptist Joint Committee page dedicated to Newseum symposium

1993 in American law
United States federal legislation
Freedom of religion in the United States
1993 in religion
United States legislation about religion